The year 1945 in film involved some significant events.

Top-grossing films (U.S.)
The top ten 1945 released films by box office gross in North America are as follows:

Events
 January 26 – The film National Velvet, starring Mickey Rooney, Elizabeth Taylor, Donald Crisp and Anne Revere, is released nationally in the United States. The film is an instant critical and commercial success, propelling 12-year-old Taylor to stardom and earning Revere the Academy Award for Best Supporting Actress.
 January 30 – Restricted release of Kolberg, an historical epic which is one of the last Nazi Germany propaganda pieces, in war-torn Berlin. Given its cast of 187,000, probably fewer people view it than appear in it.
 April 20 – Release of Son of Lassie, the 2nd Lassie film and the first film ever to be filmed using the Technicolor Monobook method, where a single magazine of film is used to record all of the primary colors. Prior to this method, the most popular recording method was 3-Strip Technicolor, which simultaneously used 3 individual film magazines to record the primary colors.
 August 10 – Animated Donald Duck short Duck Pimples is released.
 September 27 – Release of Roberto Rossellini's Roma Città aperta marks the beginning of Italian neorealism in film.
 October 5 – A strike between the set decorators' union and the studios boils over and becomes known as the Hollywood Black Friday.
 October 31 – Spellbound, a psychological thriller directed by Alfred Hitchcock, premieres in New York City.
 November 16 – Paramount Pictures releases theatrical short cartoon titled The Friendly Ghost, introducing a ghost named Casper.
 November 29 – At the Nuremberg trials a documentary on the Nazi concentration camps directed by John Ford is exhibited as evidence.

Awards

Top Ten Money Making Stars

1945 film releases

January–March
January 1945
4 January
This Man's Navy
18 January
A Song to Remember
26 January
National Velvet
February 1945
2 February
Here Come the Co-eds
15 February
The Seventh Veil
March 1945
3 March
The Picture of Dorian Gray
16 March
The House of Fear

April–June
April 1945
7 April
Brewster's Millions
17 April
Rockin' in the Rockies
20 April
 The Horn Blows at Midnight
29 April
Tarzan and the Amazons
May 1945
25 May
The Clock
June 1945
1 June
That's the Spirit
23 June
Murder, He Says
30 June
Conflict

July–September
July 1945
13 July
Story of G.I. Joe
19 July
Along Came Jones
27 July
The Woman in Green
August 1945
11 August
Christmas in Connecticut
30 August
State Fair
September 1945
22 September
Rhapsody in Blue

October–December
October 1945
20 October
Mildred Pierce
26 October
Love Letters
31 October
And Then There Were None
Spellbound
November 1945
1 November
Vacation from Marriage
10 November
Confidential Agent
December 1945
7 December
House of Dracula
8 December
The Enchanted Forest
20 December
Dick Tracy
25 December
A Walk in the Sun
28 December
Scarlet Street
31 December
They Were Expendable

Notable films released in 1945
United States unless stated

A
The Abandoned (Las Abandonadas), starring Dolores del Río and Pedro Armendáriz – (Mexico)
Abbott and Costello in Hollywood, starring Bud Abbott and Lou Costello
Allotment Wives, starring Kay Francis
Along Came Jones, starring Gary Cooper and Loretta Young
Amok – (Mexico)
Anchors Aweigh, starring Gene Kelly and Frank Sinatra
And Then There Were None, starring Barry Fitzgerald, Walter Huston, Louis Hayward, Judith Anderson

B
Back to Bataan, directed by Edward Dmytryk, with John Wayne
A Bell For Adano, starring Gene Tierney and John Hodiak
The Bells of St. Mary's, directed by Leo McCarey, starring Bing Crosby and Ingrid Bergman
Blithe Spirit, directed by David Lean, starring Rex Harrison and Constance Cummings, based on the play by Noël Coward – (GB)
Blood on the Sun, starring James Cagney
The Body Snatcher, directed by Robert Wise, starring Boris Karloff
Boule de suif (Angel and Sinner) – (France)
Bougainvillea (Bugambilia), starring Pedro Armendariz and Dolores del Río – (Mexico)
Brewster's Millions, starring Dennis O'Keefe
Brief Encounter, directed by David Lean, starring Celia Johnson and Trevor Howard- (GB)

C
Caesar and Cleopatra, directed by Gabriel Pascal, starring Vivien Leigh and Claude Rains – (GB)
Captain Kidd, starring Charles Laughton
The Cheaters, starring Joseph Schildkraut and Billie Burke
The Cherokee Flash, starring Sunset Carson and Linda Stirling
Children of Paradise (Les Enfants du Paradis), by Marcel Carné, starring Arletty,  released following the liberation of France
Christmas in Connecticut, starring Barbara Stanwyck
Circus Cavalcade (La cabalgata del circo) – (Argentina)
The Clock, starring Judy Garland
Confidential Agent, starring Charles Boyer and Lauren Bacall
Conflict, starring Humphrey Bogart
Counter-Attack, starring Paul Muni and Marguerite Chapman
The Corn Is Green, starring Bette Davis and John Dall
Cornered, directed by Edward Dmytryk, starring Dick Powell

D
Dakota, starring John Wayne
Les dames du Bois de Boulogne, directed by Robert Bresson – (France)
Dead of Night, Ealing Studios chiller compendium starring Mervyn Johns and Googie Withers – (GB) 
Death Mills, directed by Billy Wilder
Detour, starring Tom Neal and Ann Savage
Diamond Horseshoe, starring Betty Grable
Dick Tracy, starring Morgan Conway and Mike Mazurki
Dillinger, starring Lawrence Tierney
The Dolly Sisters, starring Betty Grable

E
The Enchanted Cottage, starring Dorothy McGuire and Robert Young
The Enchanted Forest, starring Harry Davenport 
Escape in the Fog, starring Otto Kruger and Nina Foch

F
Fallen Angel, directed by Otto Preminger, starring Alice Faye in her last major film role, Dana Andrews and Linda Darnell
Flame of Barbary Coast, starring John Wayne

G
The Great Flamarion, directed by Anthony Mann, starring Erich von Stroheim
Guest Wife, starring Claudette Colbert and Don Ameche
Gun Smoke, starring Johnny Mack Brown and Jennifer Holt

H
Hangover Square, starring Laird Cregar, Linda Darnell and George Sanders
Here Come the Co-Eds, starring Bud Abbott and Lou Costello
High Powered, starring Phyllis Brooks and Robert Lowery
The Horn Blows at Midnight, starring Jack Benny
Hotel Berlin, starring Faye Emerson and Raymond Massey
The House I Live In, a short film starring Frank Sinatra
House of Dracula, starring Lon Chaney, Jr. and John Carradine
The House of Fear (1945 film), a Sherlock Holmes mystery directed by Roy William Neill, starring Basil Rathbone as Holmes, and Nigel Bruce as Watson
The House on 92nd Street, produced by Louis de Rochemont, starring Lloyd Nolan and Signe Hasso
Humayun, starring Ashok Kumar – (India)

I
I Know Where I'm Going!, directed by Michael Powell and Emeric Pressburger, starring Wendy Hiller and Roger Livesey – (GB)
I Live in Grosvenor Square, starring Anna Neagle, Rex Harrison and Robert Morley – (GB)
I'll Be Your Sweetheart, directed by Val Guest, starring Margaret Lockwood (GB)
Incendiary Blonde, starring Betty Hutton
The Invisible Army (Den usynlige hær) – (Denmark)
Isle of the Dead, starring Boris Karloff and Ellen Drew
It's in the Bag!, starring Fred Allen, Jack Benny, Don Ameche

J
Johnny Angel, starring George Raft and Claire Trevor

K
Kiss and Tell, starring Shirley Temple
Kitty, directed by Mitchell Leisen, starring Paulette Goddard and Ray Milland
Kolberg – (Nazi Germany)

L
Lady on a Train, starring Deanna Durbin and Ralph Bellamy
The Last Chance (Die letzte Chance) – (Switzerland)
Leave Her to Heaven, starring Gene Tierney and Cornel Wilde
Life Begins Anew, directed by Mario Mattoli starring Alida Valli, Fosco Giachetti (Italy)
The Lost Letter (Propavshaya gramota) – (USSR)
The Lost Weekend, directed by Billy Wilder, starring Ray Milland and Jane Wyman
Love Letters, starring Jennifer Jones and Joseph Cotten

M
Madonna of the Seven Moons, starring Phyllis Calvert and Stewart Granger – (GB)
The Man in Half Moon Street, starring Nils Asther
A Medal for Benny, starring Dorothy Lamour
The Men who Tread on the Tiger's Tail (Tora no o wo fumu otokotachi), directed by Akira Kurosawa – (Japan)
Mildred Pierce, directed by Michael Curtiz, starring Joan Crawford, Ann Blyth, Jack Carson, Zachary Scott, Eve Arden
Mom and Dad, a hygiene documentary
Momotaro, Sacred Sailors (Momotarō: Umi no Shinpei), the first feature-length animated film from Japan
My Name is Julia Ross, starring Nina Foch

N
The Naughty Nineties, starring Bud Abbott and Lou Costello

O
Objective, Burma!, starring Errol Flynn
Our Vines Have Tender Grapes, starring Edward G. Robinson and Margaret O'Brien

P
Pardon My Past, starring Fred MacMurray and Marguerite Chapman
Perfect Strangers, starring Robert Donat and Deborah Kerr – (GB)
The Picture of Dorian Gray, starring George Sanders and Hurd Hatfield
Pink String and Sealing Wax, starring Googie Withers and Mervyn Johns – (GB)
La porta del cielo (The Gate of Heaven), directed by Vittorio De Sica – (Italy)
Pride of the Marines, starring John Garfield
Pursuit to Algiers, a Sherlock Holmes mystery directed by Roy William Neill, starring Basil Rathbone as Holmes, and Nigel Bruce as Watson

R
The Rake's Progress, starring Rex Harrison – (GB)
The Red Meadows (De røde enge) – (Denmark)
Rhapsody in Blue, a biopic of George Gershwin starring Robert Alda
Rockin' in the Rockies, starring the Three Stooges
Roll Call in Heaven (Cuando en el cielo pasen lista) – (Argentina)
Rome, Open City (Roma Città aperta), directed by Roberto Rossellini, starring Anna Magnani and Aldo Fabrizi – (Italy)
A Royal Scandal, starring Tallulah Bankhead
Rustlers' Hideout, starring Buster Crabbe and Al St. John

S
Salome Where She Danced, starring Yvonne De Carlo 
San Antonio, starring Errol Flynn and Alexis Smith
Saratoga Trunk, starring Gary Cooper and Ingrid Bergman
Scarlet Street, directed by Fritz Lang, starring Edward G. Robinson and Joan Bennett
La selva de fuego (The Forest Fire), starring Dolores del Río and Arturo de Córdova – (Mexico)
The Seventh Veil, starring James Mason and Ann Todd – (GB)
Son of Lassie, starring Peter Lawford
A Song to Remember, a biopic of Frédéric Chopin starring Cornel Wilde
The Southerner, starring Zachary Scott
The Spanish Main, starring Maureen O'Hara and Paul Henreid
Spellbound, directed by Alfred Hitchcock, starring Ingrid Bergman and Gregory Peck
State Fair, starring Dana Andrews and Jeanne Crain
The Stork Club, starring Betty Hutton
The Story of G.I. Joe, directed by William Wellman, starring Burgess Meredith and Robert Mitchum
The Strange Affair of Uncle Harry, starring George Sanders

T
That's the Spirit, starring Jack Oakie 
They Were Expendable, directed by John Ford, starring Robert Montgomery and John Wayne
The Thin Man Goes Home, starring William Powell and Myrna Loy
This Man's Navy, starring Wallace Beery
The Three Caballeros, a Walt Disney animated film starring Donald Duck and Dora Luz
Thrill of a Romance, directed by Richard Thorpe, starring Esther Williams and Van Johnson
Thunderhead, Son of Flicka, starring Roddy McDowall
Tonight and Every Night, starring Rita Hayworth
A Tree Grows In Brooklyn, directed by Elia Kazan, starring Dorothy McGuire
Twice Blessed, starring Lee and Lyn Wilde
Two O'Clock Courage, starring Ann Rutherford and Tom Conway

U
The Unseen, starring Joel McCrea and Gail Russell

V
The Valley of Decision, starring Greer Garson and Gregory Peck
La vida en un hilo (Life on a Wire) – (Spain)

W
A Walk in the Sun, starring Dana Andrews
War Comes to America, directed by Frank Capra and Anatole Litvak
Waterloo Road, starring John Mills and Stewart Granger – (GB)
The Way to the Stars, starring John Mills and Michael Redgrave, written by Terence Rattigan – (GB)
The Wicked Lady, starring Margaret Lockwood and James Mason – (GB)
Without Love, starring Spencer Tracy, Katharine Hepburn, Lucille Ball
The Woman in Green, a Sherlock Holmes mystery directed by Roy William Neill, starring Basil Rathbone as Holmes, and Nigel Bruce as Watson, co-starring Hillary Brook and Henry Daniell
Wonder Man, starring Danny Kaye and Virginia Mayo

Y
Yolanda and the Thief, starring Fred Astaire and Lucille Bremer

Z
Ziegfeld Follies, with an MGM all-star cast

Serials
Brenda Starr, Reporter, starring Joan Woodbury
Federal Operator 99, starring Marten Lamont
Jungle Queen, starring Edward Norris and Eddie Quillan
Jungle Raiders
Manhunt on Mystery Island, starring Richard Bailey and Linda Stirling
The Master Key, starring Dennis Moore
The Monster and the Ape, starring Robert Lowery
The Purple Monster Strikes, starring Dennis Moore and Linda Stirling
The Royal Mounted Rides Again
Secret Agent X-9, starring Lloyd Bridges
Who's Guilty?

Short film series
Mickey Mouse (1928–1953)
Looney Tunes (1930–1969)
Terrytoons (1930–1964)
Merrie Melodies (1931–1969)
Scrappy (1931–1941)
Popeye (1933–1957)
Color Rhapsodies (1934–1949)
Donald Duck (1937–1956)
Goofy (1939–1955)
Andy Panda (1939–1949)
Tom and Jerry (1940–1958)
Bugs Bunny (1940–1962)
Woody Woodpecker (1941–1949)
Swing Symphonies (1941-1945)
The Fox and the Crow (1941–1950)
Red Hot Riding Hood (1943–1949)
Droopy (1943–1958)
Screwball Squirrel (1944–1946)
Yosemite Sam (1945–1963)

Births
January 5 - Roger Spottiswoode, Canadian-British-American director, editor and writer
January 16 – Élisabeth Margoni, French actress
January 22
Jophery Brown, American pitcher, stuntman and actor (died 2014)
Michael Cristofer, American actor and filmmaker
January 25 – Leigh Taylor-Young, American actress
January 28 – Marthe Keller, Swiss actress
January 29 – Tom Selleck, American actor
February 3 – Marius Weyers, South African actor
February 4 – Tony Haygarth, English actor (died 2017)
February 9 – Mia Farrow, American actress and activist
February 12 – Maud Adams, Swedish actress
February 16 – Jeremy Bulloch, English actor (died 2020)
February 17 – Brenda Fricker, Irish actress
February 20 – Brion James, American actor (died 1999)
February 24 – Barry Bostwick, American actor
February 28 – Bubba Smith, American professional football player and actor (died 2011)
March 1 - Dirk Benedict, American actor
March 3 – Hattie Winston, American actress and voice artist
March 8 - Janet Wright, English-born Canadian actress (died 2016)
March 13 – Whitney Rydbeck, American actor
March 24
Curtis Hanson, American director, screenwriter and producer (died 2016)
Patrick Malahide, British actor and producer
March 28 – Raine Loo, Estonian actress (died 2020)
April 2 – Linda Hunt, American actress
April 3 – Catherine Spaak, Belgian-Italian actress and singer (died 2022)
April 4 - Caroline McWilliams, American actress (died 2010)
May 24 – Priscilla Presley, American actress
May 31 – Rainer Werner Fassbinder, German director, producer and screenwriter (died 1982)
June 2
Jon Peters, American producer
Joan Pringle, American actress
June 3 - Bill Paterson (actor), Scottish actor
June 6 – David Dukes, American actor (died 2000)
June 11 – Adrienne Barbeau, American actress
June 12 – Edwin Neal, American actor
July 1 – Debbie Harry, American actress and singer (lead vocalist of Blondie (band))
July 3 – Mickey Rooney Jr., American actor (died 2022)
July 6 - Burt Ward, American actor
July 23 – Edie McClurg, American actress and voice actress
July 26 – Helen Mirren, English actress
August 2 – Joanna Cassidy, American actress
August 5 – Loni Anderson, American actress
August 14 
Steve Martin, American actor and comedian
Wim Wenders, German director, producer and screenwriter
August 15 - Nigel Terry, English actor (died 2015)
August 21 – Patty McCormack, American actress
August 23 – Bob Peck, English actor (died 1999)
August 24 - Cástulo Guerra, Argentine actor
August 28 - Jeannie Linero, American actress
September 10 – Dennis Burkley, American actor (died 2013)
September 15 - Clive Merrison, British actor
September 17 – Bruce Spence, New Zealand actor
September 22 – Paul Le Mat, American actor
October 7 – Michael Wallis, American journalist, popular historian, author speaker and voice actor
October 18 – Huell Howser, American actor, television personality, host, comedian (died 2013)
October 19 – John Lithgow, American actor
October 20 - George Wyner, American actor
October 21 - Everett McGill, American actor
October 26 – Jaclyn Smith, American actress
October 27 – Carrie Snodgress, American actress (died 2004)
October 30 – Henry Winkler, American actor
October 31 – Brian Doyle-Murray, American actor and comedian
November 2 - J. D. Souther, American singer-songwriter and actor
November 8 – Angela Scoular, English actress (died 2011)
November 10 - Douglas Gresham, American-British actor and producer
November 15 – Bob Gunton, American character actor
November 21 – Goldie Hawn, American actress
November 27 – James Avery, American actor (died 2013)
November 28 – John Hargreaves, Australian actor (died 1996)
November 30 – Billy Drago, American actor (died 2019)
December 1 – Bette Midler, American actress, comedian and singer
December 13 – Heather North, American actress (died 2017)
December 17 – Ernie Hudson,  American actor
December 21 – Mari Lill, Estonian actress 
December 24 – Nicholas Meyer,  American screenwriter, director and producer
December 30 - Lloyd Kaufman, American director, screenwriter, producer and actor
December 31
Barbara Carrera, Nicaraguan-born American actress
Vernon Wells, Australian character actor

Deaths
January 14 – Heinrich Schroth, 73, German actor, Dr. Hart's Diary, Melody of a Great City, Die Entlassung, Rembrandt
February 23 – Reginald Barker, 58, American director, Civilization, The Bargain, The Coward, The Moonstone
March 4 – Lucille La Verne, 72, American actress, Snow White and the Seven Dwarfs, Abraham Lincoln, Orphans of the Storm, A Tale of Two Cities
March 4 – Mark Sandrich, 44, American director, The Gay Divorcee, Follow the Fleet, Holiday Inn
March 30 – Béla Balogh, 60, Hungarian director
April 10 – Gloria Dickson, 27, American actress, Lady of Burlesque, They Won't Forget
April 16 – Willie Fung, 49, Chinese-American actor, Come On, Cowboys, The Great Profile
April 29 – Malcolm McGregor, 52, American silent screen star, Lady of the Night, The Circle, The Whispering Shadow, The Ladybird
May 4 – Anna Dodge, 77, American actress, The Extra Girl, Ride for Your Life
July 13 – Alla Nazimova, 66, Ukrainian-born stage and film actress, Blood and Sand, Salomé, Since You Went Away, Madame Peacock
July 19 – George Barbier, 80, American actor, No One Man, Evenings for Sale, The Cat's-Paw, The Magnificent Dope
August 11 – Stefan Jaracz, 61, Polish actor, Countess Walewska
September 1 – Terry, 11, American performing Cairn Terrier, The Wizard of Oz
November 11 – Jerome Kern, 60, American composer, Show Boat, Swing Time
November 12 – Jaro Fürth, 74, Austrian actor, Diary of a Lost Girl, Joyless Street
November 21 – Robert Benchley, 56, American writer and actor, Foreign Correspondent, You'll Never Get Rich, Road to Utopia
December 25 – Russell Gleason, 37, American actor, Undercover Agent, The Covered Trailer, News Is Made at Night

Debuts
Vittorio Gassman – Inconto con Laura
Jane Greer – Pan-Americana
Silvana Mangano – The Last Judgment
Dwayne Hickman – Captain Eddie
Dean Stockwell – The Horn Blows at Midnight
Lizabeth Scott – You Came Along
Betty White – Time to Kill

Notes

 
Film by year